This is a list of museums in Emilia-Romagna, Italy.

References

Emilia-Romagna